Bremen-Burg is a railway station serving the Burg district of Bremen. It also is a junction between the lines from Bremen–Bremerhaven and to Bremen-Vegesack. The station is connected to the BSAG bus network.

References

Railway stations in Bremen (state)
Transport in Bremen (city)
Bremen S-Bahn